Harper is an unincorporated community and census-designated place (CDP), located  west of Fredericksburg on U.S. Highway 290, in Gillespie County, in the U.S. state of Texas. The population was 1,192 at the 2010 census.

Geography
Harper is located in western Gillespie County at  (30.301009, -99.243326).

The headwaters of the Pedernales River flow through the community.

History
On December 15, 1847, a petition was submitted to create Gillespie County. In 1848, the legislature formed Gillespie County from Bexar and Travis Counties.  While the signers were overwhelmingly German immigrants, names also on the petition were Castillo, Pena, Munos, and a handful of Anglo names.

The first white settlers were the families of Eli McDonald and Matthew Taylor in 1863. A historical marker just south of U.S. Highway 290 commemorates the McDonald massacre of August 1864. This incident involved the killing of two family members and the kidnapping of five more by Kiowa Indians.

A post office was established in 1883 by George Franklin Harper, for whom the town was named. By 1985, the town served a large ranching area and had six churches, a fire department and ambulance services, a public school, and growing residential subdivisions. The population of the area exceeded 1,000 by 2000.

Demographics
As of the census of 2000,  1,006 people, 417 households, and 293 families resided in the CDP. The population density was 17.8 people per square mile (6.9/km2). The 536 housing units averaged 9.5/sq mi (3.7/km2). The racial makeup of the CDP was 95.73% White, 0.10% African American, 0.80% Native American, 0.10% Asian, 2.39% from other races, and 0.89% from two or more races. Hispanics or Latinos of any race were 4.97% of the population.

Of the 417 households, 30.5% had children under the age of 18 living with them, 62.4% were married couples living together, 6.2% had a female householder with no husband present, and 29.5% were not families; 27.1% of all households were made up of individuals, and 13.4% had someone living alone who was 65 years of age or older. The average household size was 2.41 and the average family size was 2.93.

In the CDP, the population was distributed as 25.0% under the age of 18, 4.8% from 18 to 24, 24.6% from 25 to 44, 27.5% from 45 to 64, and 18.2% who were 65 years of age or older. The median age was 41 years. For every 100 females, there were 93.5 males. For every 100 females age 18 and over, there were 93.1 males.

The median income for a household in the CDP was $31,776, and for a family was $39,013. Males had a median income of $26,900 versus $23,421 for females. The per capita income for the CDP was $15,318. About 10.8% of families and 17.3% of the population were below the poverty line, including 22.5% of those under age 18 and 10.7% of those age 65 or over.

Education
Harper is served by the Harper Independent School District.

Climate
The climate in this area is characterized by hot, humid summers and generally mild to cool winters.  According to the Köppen climate classification system, Harper has a humid subtropical climate, Cfa on climate maps.

References

External links
 
 Harper Library
 Harper ISD

Census-designated places in Gillespie County, Texas
Census-designated places in Texas
Unincorporated communities in Gillespie County, Texas
Unincorporated communities in Texas
Populated places established in 1863